Athylia flavovittata is a species of beetle in the family Cerambycidae. It was described by Breuning in 1938.

References

Athylia
Beetles described in 1938